"Spellbound" is the first single released by Lacuna Coil's fifth studio album, Shallow Life. The song is their first chart entry on the U.S. Billboard charts since "Our Truth" in 2006. It debuted at #36 on the U.S. Billboard Hot Mainstream Rock Tracks chart, and has become their first Top 30 single on that chart. The single officially debuted on 21 February 2009, when the band performed at the Soundwave Festival in Brisbane, Australia.

Music video

The music video for "Spellbound" was directed by Italian director Roberto Cinardi aka Saku and filmed in Milan at Dolce & Gabbana's Gold in February 2009. The clip was produced by Apnea Film and the costume was designed by Dolce & Gabbana. A 30-second teaser of the video was released on Italian MTV website on 23 March, before MTV Brand:New premiered the entire video the same day.

The music video shows the band performing the song in the fashionable Dolce & Gabbana Gold restaurant. 
The second version of the video alternate images of the band is performing in the middle of a golden room with images of different aspects of being under a spell of something: the girl obsessed by her weight and look, the guy who wants to be a superman, the politician, etc.

The video won an award in Italy at Premio Videoclip Italiano for "Best Editing" in 2009.

 Director: Saku
 Producer: Don Gilmore
 Director of Photography: Patrizio Saccò
 Editor: Saku
 Production Company: Apnea Film

Track listing
 iTunes Digital Download Single
 "Spellbound" - 3:21
 "Audio Commentary Spellbound (Cristina Scabbia Talks About the Forthcoming Lacuna Coil Album Shallow Life)" -	4.31

Release history

Chart performance
The single peaked at #30 on the U.S. Billboard Hot Mainstream Rock Tracks chart in July 2009. It became the band's second single to chart in the United States, as well as their second Top 40 single on the rock charts. "Our Truth" reached #36 in 2006. It also peaked at #24 on the US Active Rock chart in September 2009.

Footnotes

2009 singles
Lacuna Coil songs
2009 songs
EMI Records singles
Century Media Records singles
Songs written by Andrea Ferro
Songs written by Cristina Scabbia
Songs written by Don Gilmore (record producer)